Frank William Chase (born September 12, 1970) is a Tony Award-nominated American actor, director, and singer, best known for his work on Broadway and for his role as country superstar Luke Wheeler on ABC's Nashville.

Early life and education
Chase was born in Frankfort, Kentucky, to Betty and Jerry Chase, and is the youngest of three sons.  He graduated from Western Hills High School and the Oberlin Conservatory of Music, where he studied conducting with Robert Spano and percussion with Michael Rosen.

Career
Chase started his acting career in Chicago, performing in regional theater productions and received three Joseph Jefferson Award nominations. He then played Chris in the 2nd National Tour of Miss Saigon. He first performed on Broadway in 1998 as the Squeegee Man and Mark/Roger understudy in Rent, and went on to star as Roger in the final Broadway company of Rent, which was recorded for the theatrical release entitled Rent: Filmed Live on Broadway. His additional Broadway credits in the early 2000s include Miss Saigon (with the original star Lea Salonga playing Kim to close the Broadway production); The Full Monty (2001); Aida (Radames replacement, 2003–04); and Lennon (2005). Tony in Billy Elliot the Musical. He was also in A Little Princess the Musical as Captain Crewe. In 2005, he played Neville Craven in the 2005 World AIDS Day The Secret Garden concert.

In 2006, he starred in High Fidelity on Broadway, and played Valentin in Kiss of the Spider Woman at the Signature Theatre in Arlington, Virginia, for which he received a nomination for the 2009 Helen Hayes Award for Outstanding Lead Actor.

He appeared in The Pajama Game opposite Kate Baldwin at The Muny (St. Louis) in July 2007. He starred in Oklahoma in 2007 at the Lyric Theatre opposite Kelli O'Hara, and on Broadway in the short-lived musical The Story of My Life in 2009. Starting in 2009, Chase played the role of Tony in Billy Elliot the Musical until 2011.  In August 2012, he temporarily filled in for Matthew Broderick as Jimmy Winter in the Broadway musical, Nice Work If You Can Get It. 

At the 2013 Tony Awards, he was nominated for Tony Award for Best Featured Actor in a Musical for his role as John Jasper/Mr. Clive Paget in the Broadway revival of The Mystery of Edwin Drood.

Chase guest starred as Michael Swift in the NBC series Smash. He then went on to star for 3 seasons as country superstar Luke Wheeler on the television series Nashville. His other television appearances include Quantico, HBO's The Deuce, the recurring role of Pat Mahoney on Rescue Me, Cupid, Canterbury's Law, Law & Order, Third Watch, Conviction, and Queens Supreme, Hallmark's The Lost Valentine, alongside Jennifer Love Hewitt and Betty White; the 2011 season finale of Royal Pains (USA); Blue Bloods (CBS); and the ABC drama Pan Am. In 2012, he appeared on the series White Collar, in the episode "Neighborhood Watch", and appeared on the series Unforgettable, in the episode "The Comeback". 

He played the title role in the 2013 film Butterflies of Bill Baker, winning Best Actor at the 2013 Chain Film Festival. Chase also voiced the wolf Angee in A Warrior's Tail (2016).

In 2016, Chase assumed the role of William Shakespeare from Christian Borle on Broadway in the musical Something Rotten!, while simultaneously filming both HBO's The Deuce, and the ABC drama Time After Time, in the series regular role of Griffin Monroe. 

He played Neil Hargrove in the second season of the American supernatural horror-science fiction web television series, Stranger Things, which premiered in late 2017, and in 2018 appeared in HBO's drama Sharp Objects as Bob Nash.

He starred as Fred Graham/Petruchio opposite Kelli O'Hara in the 2019 Broadway revival of Kiss Me, Kate.

In 2020 and 2021, he wrote and directed the award- winning short film Dagger, co-starring Jack Davenport, and Trunk Show, which featured his children, actors Daisy and Gracie Chase, winning Best Short Film at the 2021 Ridgewood Guild International Film Festival. Also in 2021, he played Michael Friedman in Danny Strong’s Pulitzer Prize-winning series Dopesick.

In 2022, he played Kurt Dockweiler in the first season of Bosch: Legacy, and finished production on Apple TV's The Crowded Room, starring opposite Tom Holland.

In 2023, Chase will direct the musical short film Here, Bullet, which he co-wrote with composer Kurt Erickson, based on Erickson's prize-winning song cycle of the same name, which was adapted from the original anthology of 2005 Beatrice Hawley Award-winning poems, "Here, Bullet", by renowned American poet Brian Turner.

Personal life
Chase has two children, actors Daisy and Gracie Chase, with the late Lori Davis, to whom he was married from 1996 to 2008. He was married to actress Stephanie Gibson from 2009 until their divorce in 2012.

He and Debra Messing dated from 2011 to 2014.

He has been in a relationship with musician Ingrid Michaelson since 2015.

Filmography

Actor

Director

Broadway Credits

Awards and nominations

Tony Awards

Other awards

References

External links
Official Website

1970 births
20th-century American male actors
21st-century American male actors
American country singer-songwriters
American male film actors
American male musical theatre actors
American male television actors
Living people
Male actors from Kentucky
Oberlin Conservatory of Music alumni
People from Frankfort, Kentucky
Singer-songwriters from Kentucky
Country musicians from Kentucky
American male singer-songwriters